Below is a partial list of shows that were previously aired on Metro Channel and Lifestyle. For the current programs which are airing, see List of programs broadcast by Metro Channel.

Previous programming

Metro Channel & Lifestyle Produced Programs
 Fashion Nation (2008)
 InSight (2008)
 MomWorks (2008)
 F.A.S.H.  (Fashion And Style Hub) (2010) 
 Sharon At Home (2010)
 Curiosity Got The Chef (2014–2018)
 Amanda Loving Life
 Leading Ladies
 Foodprints
 Good Finds
 Interior Motives
 Listed
 Metabeats (2016–2018)
 The Modern Girls (2016)
 The Scene

Non-Metro Channel & Lifestyle Produced Programs
 Belo Beauty 101
 Behind the Brand: The Philippine Fashion Week TV
 Chefscapades
 Everyday Creations
 Market to Master
 Philippine Realty TV
 Runway TV
 Sabrina's Kitchen
 San Miguel Purefoods Kwentong Kusina Kwentong Buhay

Home & Living
Formerly known as HGTV, DiY Network and Home on Lifestyle.

 24 Hour Design
 A Gardener's Diary
 A-List Listings
 The Amandas
 The Antonio Treatment
 The Art Show
 At Home With
 Awesome Interiors
 Bed & Bath Designs
 Beyond the Box
 Buying Asia
 Built
 The Carol Duvall Show
 Carter Can
 Celebrity House Hunting
 Clean House
 Clean House Come Clean
 Clean House New York
 Color Splash
 Consumed
 Country Dreams
 Cousins Undercover
 Crafts
 Creative Juice
 Decorating Cents
 Deserving Design
 Design Addict
 Design Touch
 Design Wars
 Designer Guys
 Designer Finals
 Embellish This
 The Fabulous Beekman Boys
 FreeStyle
 The Fix
 Get Color
 Get It Together
 HGTV Design Star
 HGTV Showdown and HGTV Summer Showdown
 Hotel Hell
 How Clean Is Your House?
 If Walls Could Talk
 Intérieurs
 Interior By Design
 International Open House
 Jewelry Making
 Living Abroad
 Katie Brown
 Martha Stewart Living
 Million Dollar Contractor
 Mission: Organization
 Outer Spaces
 Picker Sisters
 Secrets From a Stylist
 Sensibly Chic
 Treasure Makers
 Martha
 Million Dollar Listing Los Angeles
 Million Dollar Listing New York
 Property Envy
 Scrapbooking
 Style Department
 Summer Home
 The Whole Picture
 Walls at Work

Food & Travel
Formerly known as Food Network, Fine Living, Limelight, Tripping and Food on Lifestyle.

 30 Minute Meals
 4 Ingredients
 A Very Hungry Frenchman
 All That's Fit
 All-Girl Getaways
 Alternate Route
 Ace of Cakes
 Around The World with Mamu
 The Art of Cooking with Mimi
 Ayesha's Home Kitchen
 Back to Basics
 Barefoot Contessa
 Barefoot Contessa: Back to Basics
 Bazaar
 Behind the Bash
 The Best Things I Ever Ate
 Bill's Food
 Bill's Holiday
 Blue List
 Bobby Flay's BBQ Adicttion
 Boy Meets Grill
 Breathing Room
 Brunch @ Bobby's
 Chocolate Covered
 Cutthroat Kitchen
 Ciao America with Mario Batali
 Chefs vs. City
 Closet Cases
 Corner Table with Bill Boggs
 Cupcake Wars
 Date Plate
 Delicious Iceland
 The Delicious Ms. Dahl
 Dining in Style
 Eat St.
 Essence of India with Samira
 Essential
 Ever Wondered About Food
 Forbes Luxe 11
 The Great British Bake-Of: Masterclass (Season 6)
 How to Cook Well
 I Want Your Job
 Kitchen Nightmares (Season 1 to 5)
 Mad Hungry
 Martha Bakes
 Martha's Cooking School
 East Meets West
 The Emeril Lagasse Show
 Emeril Live
 Essence of Emeril
 Everyday Baking
 Everyday Food
 Everyday Gourmet
 Everyday Italian
 Extreme Cuisine
 The F Word
 Fine Living Specials
 From Martha's Kitchen
 Flavours of Greece
 Flavours of Peru
 Flavours of Spain
 Food 911
 Food Essay
 Food Fight
 Food Safari
 The Good Cook
 The Genuine Article
 Gordon Ramsay's Ultimate Home Cooking
 Giada at Home
 Giada in Italy
 Giada's Weekend Getaways
 Globe Trekker
 Gok Cooks Chinese
 Gordon's Great Escape
 Good Eats
 The Great Adventure
 The Great Food Truck Race
 Great Cocktails
 Grillin' & Chillin' 
 The Hairy Bikers' Cookbook
 Healthy Appetite with Ellie Krieger
 Heston's Feast
 Hot Off The Grill
 Ian Wright: Out of Bounds
 In Search of Perfection
 Indian Food Made Easy
 Inside Dish
 Iron Chef America
 Jamie's Great Italian Escape
 Jamie's Kitchen
 Jamie's Kitchen: Australia
 Julian and Camilla's World Odyssey
 Kimchi Chronicles
 The Kitchen Musical
 The Boston: The Kitchen Musical
 Lonely Planet Six Degrees: China
 Lorraine's Fast, Fresh and Easy Food
 Lost in Italy
 Mario Eats Italy
 Market Values
 Martha Stewart's Cooking School
 Masterchef U.S.
 Mexican Food Made Simple
 Ming's Quest
 Molto Mario
 My Country, My Kitchen 
 My Ireland with Collin
 My France with Mamu: Paris to Strasburg
 Napa Style
 Nigella Bites
 The Next Food Network Star
 The Next Iron Chef
 The Kitchen (Season 2)
 Oliver's Twist
 The Originals with Emeril
 The Other Side
 Pairings with Andrea
 Party Line with The Hearty Boys
 Peta Unplugged
 Peta Unplugged: 10 Recipes For Summer Entertaining
 Pizza Masters
 The Pioneer Woman
 Quick Fix Meals
 Rachael Allen's Cake Diaries
 Rachael Ray
 Rachael's Vacation
 Radical Sabbatical
 Rick Stein's India
 Ride with Mr. Wright
 Road and Track
 Samantha Brown: Passport to Europe
 Sea Nation
 Secret Gardens with Chef Du Jour
 Shiela Bridges: Designer Living
 Sicily with Aldo and Enzo
 The Shopping Detective
 Simply Wine
 Spice Trip
 Sugar Rush
 Sweet Dreams
 Sweet Genius
 The Taste (Season 1 and 2)
 Taste the Wine
 This is Brazil
 Throwdown with Bobby Flay
 Trip of a Lifetime
 Tom Daley Goes Global
 Too Hot Tamales
 Two Greedy Italians
 Tyler's Ultimate
 Unwrapped
 Ultimate Kitchens
 The Well-Seasoned Traveler
 Wolfgang Puck
 Wolfgang Puck: Cooking Class
 Worst Cooks in America (Seasons 1 to 4)
 Your Private Island

Fashion & Style
Formerly known as In Style, Limelight, Metro TV and Self on Lifestyle.

 10 Ways
 Alter Eco
 BTVR
 Bank of Hollywood
 The Big Party Plan Off
 Biography
 Bolly Blast
 Breakthrough with Tony Robbins
 The Brini Maxwell Show
 Bringing Up Baby
 Cheer Perfection
 Co-Ed Training
 The Conversation with Amanda de Cadenet
 Dance Off The Inches
 The Doctors
 Dress My Nest
 Dresscue Me
 E! News Weekend
 E! True Hollywood Story
 The Early Show
 Extreme
 Extreme Makeover: Home Edition
 Fashion Trance
 The Fashionista Diaries
 Finding Sarah
 Fitness Beach
 Flipping Out
 Glam Fairy
 Glamour UK: 50 Best Dressed List
 Gone Bad
 Grand Designs Abroad
 The Great Sewing Bee
 Grow Your Own Drugs
 Guess Who's Coming to Decorate?
 Giuliana & Bill
 Homemade Millionaire
 How Do I Look?
 How to Look Good Naked (UK Version)
 I Do Diaries
 I Propose
 Iconoclasts
 In The Bedroom
 Instant Beauty Pageant
 Intimate Portrait
 Isaac
 It's a Brad, Brad World (Season 2)
 The Janice Dickinson Modeling Agency (Seasons 1 & 2)
 Jerseylicious
 Kidnapped By The Kids
 Kimora: Life in the Fab Lane
 Kylie Kwong: My China
 Life & Style
 The Look for Less
 Love/Lust
 Making Over America with Trinny and Susannah
 Martha Stewart Living
 Mary Queen of Frocks
 Mary Queen of Shops
 Merge
 Model TV
 Mrs. Eastwood & Company
 My Celebrity Home
 My Shopping Addiction
 The New Fitness Collection
 The Newlyweds
 Next Door with Katie Brown
 Oprah's Big Give
 Peter Perfect
 Real Simple Real Life
 Revealed with Jules Asner
 The Right Fit
 Roseanne's Nuts
 Royal Inquest
 Ruby
 Say No to The Knife
 Searching For
 Second Look
 Seriously Funny Kids
 Split Ends
 She's Got the Look
 Style By Jury
 Style Her Famous
 Style Star
 Stylemaker
 The Supersizers Go...
 Tacky House
 Toned Up
 Trinny and Susannah Undress
 The Truth About Sexes
 Videofashion News
 Videofashion Specials
 What Not to Wear
 What Not to Wear (U.S.)
 Whatever, Martha!
 What I Hate About Me
 What's Good For You
 Whose Wedding Is It Anyway?
 Wild On!
 Yoga For Life
 You're Invited

(hook-up with, Limelight TelevisionandBY/Lifetime Television)

Entertainment & Glamour

Formerly known as Limelight and Entertainment

 3
 A Chance to Dance
 Bet on Your Baby
 The Borgias
 Chasing Life
 Dance Moms
 Downton Abbey
 Full Circle
 Il Paradiso delle Signore (as "The Ladies Paradise")
 Lifestyle Presents
 Lindsay
 Made in Chelsea (Season 5 to 7)
 Medici: Masters of Florence
 OTRC (On The Red Carpet)
 Playing House (Season 1)
 Pretty Wicked Moms
 Princesses: Long Island
 The Real Housewives of Beverly Hills
 The Real Housewives of Miami
 The Time in Between
 The Veiled Lady
 Young Hollywood's Greatest

Special Coverage

 The Royal Wedding of the Century (April 29, 2011 – official provider in partnership with BBC Worldwide) 
 Oscars (2014)
 Fashion Rocks  (September 10, 2014)
  Annual Tony Awards (2014–2017)
 68th Tony Awards (June 14, 2014)
 69th Tony Awards (June 9, 2015)
 70th Tony Awards (June 13, 2016)
 71st Tony Awards (June 17, 2017)
 Primetime Emmy Awards (2014–present)
 66th Annual Primetime Emmy Awards (August 26, 2014)
 67th Annual Primetime Emmy Awards (September 21, 2015)
 68th Annual Primetime Emmy Awards (September 19, 2016)
 69th Annual Primetime Emmy Awards (September 18, 2017)
 Screen Actors Guild Awards (2016–present)
 22nd Screen Actors Guild Awards (February 1, 2016) 
 23rd Screen Actors Guild Awards (January 30, 2017) 
 24th Screen Actors Guild Awards (January 22, 2018)

TV specials

 METROWear Icon Rajo Laurel: The TV Special (June 22, 2013)
 METROWear Icon Francis Libiran: The TV Special (January 25, 2014)
 METRO Society 10: The Charity & Thanksgiving Event TV Special

Local short segments

In between shows or commercial breaks, the channel were produced short segments.

 Scene and Heard – on events in town.
 Up and Coming – a segment on upcoming events.
 Objekt d' Art – a special segment on arts and culture.
 Fork on the Road – a segment on culinary.
 Life & Leisure – a guide on must-have establishments for all occasions.
 Savvy Shopper – a segment for consumers.
 Signature Dish – a culinary segment on restaurants as featured with professional chefs in the country.
 A Mile a Minute – a segment about travel and leisure.
 METRO Cover to Cover – a segment on the upcoming issue of METRO Magazine as featured with personalities behind the camera.
 Passion Journal – a segment on monthly and weekly journal highlights for occasions.
 Short Listed – a quick segment based on the program line-up.

References

External links 
 

Creative Programs
Lists of television series by network